The violet wood hoopoe (Phoeniculus damarensis) is a species of bird in the family Phoeniculidae.  It is found in Angola, Kenya, Namibia, and Tanzania. It looks similar to the black-billed wood hoopoe but with a red beak and a green throat.

Taxonomy
Grant's wood hoopoe (P. d. granti) is sometimes considered a full species.

References

External links
 Violet wood hoopoe - Species text in The Atlas of Southern African Birds.

violet wood hoopoe
Birds of Sub-Saharan Africa
violet wood hoopoe
Taxonomy articles created by Polbot